Marawi, also known as Hamdani, is a white grape variety indigenous to the Southern Levant. Menahem de Lonsano mentioned it as one of the wine varieties available in Jerusalem in the 17th century.

Two wineries released wines made from this grape in 2014. The Cremisan Cellars winery located in the Cremisan valley between Jerusalem and Bethlehem, made wine from Hamdani and Jandali grapes grown in the areas of Hebron and Bethlehem.

Recanati winery made its own wine from Marawi grapes in 2014 with grapes sourced from a Palestinian vineyard.

References 

Israeli wine
Palestinian wine
White wine grape varieties